Sevenoaks Prep School is a co-educational, day preparatory school for 385 pupils aged 2–13 in Sevenoaks in south-east England. The school is situated on the Sackville estate, on grounds bordering the park of Knole House. It was founded in 1919 and has been at its current site since 1968.

Notable former pupils and teachers 
 Dan Clews: singer-songwriter;
 Mike Conway: 2006 Champion in British Formula 3 international motor racing, British karting Formula A champion, Formula Renault champion 2004
 James Graham-Brown: County Cricket for Kent, Derbyshire and Dorset
 Brian Kinsey: former captain of Charlton Athletic F.C.; played 418 matches for Charlton from 1956 to 1971
 Ian Walker: British Yachtsman of the Year 2001, double Olympic Games silver medallist, skipper of the GBR Challenge to the Americas Cup 2002

References

External links
School website
Profile on the ISC website
ISI inspection reports
Early years Ofsted inspection reports

Schools in Sevenoaks
Preparatory schools in Kent